The art of parliamentary sketch writing has been a tradition of British parliamentary life since the early 18th century. At that time, there were parliamentary restrictions on how the business of the House of Commons could be reported, and upon reporting on the Members of Parliament associated with the events. Members of the public could watch from the gallery, but space was restricted. Thus, some writers took to giving the MPs pseudonyms, and placing them in made up contexts, cryptically to inform the public. These reports soon became humorous, and started to be referred to as sketches. Nowadays, the tradition persists, in spite of televised coverage of the House of Commons, and these sketches are published daily in The Times, The Independent, The Guardian and The Daily Telegraph.

Notable sketch writers

18th century
Samuel Johnson

19th century
Thomas Barnes
Henry Lucy
William White

20th century
Andrew Alexander
Andrew Gimson
Simon Hoggart
Frank Johnson
Quentin Letts
Matthew Parris

21st century
Steve Burgess (Canada)
John Crace
Michael Deacon
Madeline Grant
Robert Hutton
Patrick Kidd
Tom Peck

References

House of Commons of the United Kingdom